Alima Boumediene-Thiery (born 24 July 1956) was a Member of the European Parliament (1999–2004) and a member of the Senate of France (2004–2011), representing the city of Paris.  She was a member of the French Green party. She took part in the 1983 March for Equality and against Racism.

References

1956 births
Living people
French Senators of the Fifth Republic
French people of Moroccan descent
The Greens (France) MEPs
The Greens (France) politicians
Socialist Party (France) politicians
MEPs for France 1999–2004
20th-century women MEPs for France
21st-century women MEPs for France
Women members of the Senate (France)
Senators of Paris
People from Argenteuil
Politicians from Île-de-France